Marboré Peak (Pic de Marboré, El Marboré) is  a summit in the Pyrenees located on the Franco-Spanish border crest in the Monte Perdido Range.

Topography 
Marboré Peak is one of the peaks above Cirque de Gavarnie. It marks the border between the Pyrenees National Park (France) and the Ordesa y Monte Perdido National Park (Spain).

 French side : it is situated in the commune of Gavarnie in the Canton de Luz-Saint-Sauveur, Hautes-Pyrénées department, Midi-Pyrénées region. 
 Spanish side : it is situated in the comarca of Sobrarbe, province of Huesca, autonomous community of Aragon.

History 
Philippe de Nemours in 1846 was perhaps the first to have climbed Marboré Peak, though we lack precision to attribute it to him.

See also 
 List of Pyrenean three-thousanders

References 

Mountains of the Pyrenees
Mountains of Hautes-Pyrénées
Pyrenean three-thousanders